Cantin is a commune of the Hauts-de-France region in the Nord department in northern France.

Population

Heraldry

See also
Communes of the Nord department

References

Communes of Nord (French department)
French Flanders